Brian Johnson (22 September 1932 – 4 May 2015) was an Australian rules footballer who played with North Melbourne in the Victorian Football League (VFL).

Notes

External links 

2015 deaths
1932 births
Australian rules footballers from Victoria (Australia)
North Melbourne Football Club players
University Blacks Football Club players